Eli Balas is an Israeli professional poker player, based in Las Vegas, Nevada.

Balas has won 3 bracelets at the World Series of Poker (WSOP). He has also finished 2nd in 5 WSOP preliminary events.

Balas finished on the television bubble, which was 7th place, for the inaugural World Poker Tour (WPT) event and made two final tables of the Ultimate Poker Challenge.

As of 2008, his total live tournament winnings exceed $1,300,000. His 24 cashes at the WSOP account for $1,148,041 of those winnings.

WSOP Bracelets

Notes

External links
 Eli Balas Hendon Mob tournament results

American poker players
Living people
World Series of Poker bracelet winners
Year of birth missing (living people)